87th Street (Woodruff) is an electrified commuter rail station along the Metra Electric Main Line in the Chatham neighborhood of Chicago, Illinois. The station's rank is tied with the neighboring 83rd Street (Avalon Park) station.

Like much of the main branch of the Metra Electric line, 87th Street-Woodruff is built on elevated tracks near the embankment of a bridge over 87th Street. This bridge also carries the Amtrak line that runs parallel to it, carrying the City of New Orleans, Illini, and Saluki trains.

East of this station is another Metra Electric station on 87th Street on the South Chicago Branch at 87th Street and Baltimore Avenue. Approximately one mile west of the Woodruff station is the 87th Street station on the CTA Red Line at the Dan Ryan Expressway.

At the Woodruff station, street-side parking is available on the southwest and southeast corners of 87th Street and Dauphin Avenue at the north end of Dauphin Park. This can be found on the west side of the station just south of 87th Street. Though Metra's official website claims no bus connections are available, CTA's 87 bus does stop at Dauphin and Ingleside Avenues near the station, as well as on South Dobson Avenue on the east side of the station. The northbound 4 Cottage Grove bus stops on the southeast corner of 87th Street and Cottage Grove Avenue and the southbound 4 stops on the northwest corner of 87th Street and Cottage Grove. This intersection is about a quarter-mile west of the Woodruff station.

Bus connections
CTA

  87 87th

References

External links 

87th Street entrance from Google Maps Street View

Metra stations in Chicago
Former Illinois Central Railroad stations